River Plate took part in Uruguayan Primera División reaching 8th position and qualifying for 2022 Copa Sudamericana.

Transfer Window

Summer 2021

In

Out

Winter 2021

In

Out

Squad

First team squad

Top Scorers 

Last updated on Dec 5, 2021

Disciplinary Record 

Last updated on Dec 6, 2021

Primera División

Apetura 2021

League table

Results by round

Matches

Clausura 2021

League table

Results by round

Matches

Overall

League table

References

River Plate Montevideo seasons
River Plate